Errol Simunapendi (born 10 September 1987) is an Indonesian professional footballer who currently plays as a defender for Persiram Raja Ampat in the Indonesia Super League.

External links
 
 Player profil at goal.com
 Player profil  at ligaindonesia.co.id

1987 births
Living people
Indonesian footballers
Liga 1 (Indonesia) players
Persiram Raja Ampat players
Association football defenders